The Jury of Fate is a 1917 American silent drama film directed by Tod Browning. Mabel Taliaferro plays a brother and sister dual role in the film, which is set in Canada. With no prints of The Jury of Fate located in any film archives, it is a lost film.

Plot
As described in a film magazine, Henri Labordie (Tavernier) is the father of twins. Jeanne (Taliaferro) is sweet and winsome while her brother Jaques (Taliaferro), pampered by her father, is ill-tempered. When Jaques dies through his own caddishness, Jeanne, to spare her father from the shock, clips off her hair and dons boys clothing so that her father will think that it was her and not Jaques who drowned in a stream. When Labordie dies, Jeanne's deception ends when she goes to Montreal to fulfill an ancient pact, and there she finds happiness.

Cast
 William Sherwood as Donald Duncan
 Mabel Taliaferro as Jaques / Jeanne
 Frank Bennett as François Leblanc (credited as Frank Fisher Bennett)
 Charles Fang as Ching
 Albert Tavernier as Henri Labordie
 Bradley Barker as Louis Hebert
 H. F. Webber as Duval Hebert

Reception
Like many American films of the time, The Jury of Fate was subject to cuts by city and state film censorship boards. The Chicago Board of Censors cut the scene showing a woman in travail prior to the birth of a baby, a closeup of a half-breed choking a man over a railing, and shortened a scene with a man on the floor showing blood.

References

External links

1917 films
1917 drama films
Silent American drama films
American silent feature films
American black-and-white films
Films directed by Tod Browning
Lost American films
Metro Pictures films
1917 lost films
Lost drama films
1910s American films